Yeniçiftlik  (literally New farm) is a town in Marmaraereğlisi district  of Tekirdağ Province, Turkey. Although the original settlement was a few kilometers north of the sea side, the new quarters of the town are at the Marmara Sea coast. The population of Yeniçiftlik is 7356 as of 2011. The town was mostly a Bulgarian settlement during the Ottoman Empire era. But according to agreement the former population of the town was replaced by the Turks from Bulgaria in the first quarter of the 20th century. The settlement was specialized vinification  in the early years of the Turkish republic with the help of German investors. But the main agricultural product is sun flower. Fishery and cattle rising are among the other activities.

References

Populated places in Tekirdağ Province
Towns in Turkey
Marmara Ereğlisi District
Populated coastal places in Turkey